Theodore J. Pahle (1899–1979) was an American cinematographer who worked in the film industries of several countries. He is also known as Ted Pahle.

Selected filmography

 East Side, West Side (1927)
 Stolen Love (1928)
 The Jazz Age (1929)
 The Lights of Buenos Aires (1931)
 A Gentleman in Tails (1931)
 Marius (1931)
 The Improvised Son (1932)
 The Premature Father (1933)
 A Love Story (1933)
 Monsieur Sans-Gêne (1935)
 Tomfoolery (1936)
 Catherine the Last (1936)
 Romance (1936)
 Court Theatre (1936)
 Hannerl and Her Lovers (1936)
 The Alibi (1937)
 Ultimatum (1938)
 Gibraltar (1938)
 Storm Over Asia (1938)
 Conflict (1938)
 The Lafarge Case (1938)
 Bel Ami (1939)
 Entente cordiale (1939)
 The Unloved Woman (1940)
 The Queen's Flower Girl (1940)
 The Reluctant Hero (1941)
 Madrid Carnival (1941)
 Idols (1943)
 Just Any Woman (1949)
 The Captain from Loyola (1949)
 The Duchess of Benameji (1949)
 Agustina of Aragon (1950)
 Spanish Serenade (1952)
 Lola the Coalgirl (1952)
 Last Day (1952)
 The Cheerful Caravan (1953)
 All Is Possible in Granada (1954)
 Señora Ama (1955)

References

Bibliography
 John T. Soister. Conrad Veidt on Screen: A Comprehensive Illustrated Filmography. McFarland, 2002.

External links

1899 births
1979 deaths
American cinematographers